California's 12th State Senate district is one of 40 California State Senate districts. It is currently represented by Republican Shannon Grove of Bakersfield.

District profile

Since 2022 
New district boundaries drawn by the 2020 California Citizens Redistricting Commission went into effect for the 2022 elections. The 12th State Senate district now includes portions of Fresno County, Kern, and Tulare Counties, including the following cities:
 California City
 Clovis
 Exeter
 Maricopa
 Ridgecrest
 Taft
 Tehachapi
 Bakersfield (part)
 Fresno (part)
 Shafter (part)
 Tulare (part)
 Visalia (part)

The district also includes the Tule River Indian Reservation, Cold Springs Rancheria, Big Sandy Rancheria, and Table Mountain Rancheria.

Tourism, agriculture, and ranching are important in the district. The neighboring districts 14 and 16 were specifically drawn to allow Latino voters to elect state senators of their choice in order to comply with the Voting Rights Act, which affected the western border of District 12.

The district's racial/ethnic demographics (based on the 2020 census) are as follows:

2012-2022 
The district included the Salinas Valley and a swath of the Central Valley between Modesto and Fresno. The rural district was primarily agricultural and heavily Latino.

Fresno County – 14.3%
 Coalinga
 Firebaugh
 Fowler
 Huron
 Kerman
 Kingsburg
 Mendota
 San Joaquin

Madera County – 81.1%
 Chowchilla
 Madera

All of Merced County
 Atwater
 Dos Palos
 Gustine
 Livingston
 Los Banos
 Merced

Monterey County – 54.2%
 Gonzales
 Greenfield
 King City
 Salinas
 Soledad

All of San Benito County
 Hollister
 San Juan Bautista

Stanislaus County – 27.6%
 Ceres
 Newman
 Modesto – 11.5%
 Patterson

The district's demographics (based on the 2010 census) were as follows:

As of February 18, 2020, the district had 377,188 registered voters, of whom 45.00% were registered as Democrats, 26.35% were registered as Republicans, and 23.22% were registered with no party preference.

Election results from statewide races

List of senators 
Due to redistricting, the 12th district has been moved around different parts of the state. Its current boundaries resulted from the redistricting after the 2020 census by the California Citizens Redistricting Commission and went into effect in 2022.

Election results 1994 - present

2022

2018

2014

2010

2006

2002

1998

1994

Maps

See also 
 California State Senate
 California State Senate districts
 Districts in California

References

External links 
 District map from the California Citizens Redistricting Commission

12
Government of Fresno County, California
Government of Madera County, California
Government of Merced County, California
Government of Monterey County, California
Government of San Benito County, California
Government of Stanislaus County, California
Ceres, California
Chowchilla, California
Coalinga, California
Hollister, California
Los Banos, California
Madera, California
Merced, California
Modesto, California
Salinas, California
San Juan Bautista, California